Lumajangdong Co or Lumajiang Dongcuo is a lake in the Ngari Prefecture, Tibet, China with an area of 250 km². It is located at 34° 2' 0" and 81° 40' 0". Gormain lies a few miles (5–7 km) to the northwest.

References

External links
 Photograph 
 Map showing location of the lake

Lakes of Tibet
Ngari Prefecture